This is an alphabetical  list of road junctions in the United Kingdom.

List of road junctions in the United Kingdom: 0-A
List of road junctions in the United Kingdom: B
List of road junctions in the United Kingdom: C
List of road junctions in the United Kingdom: D
List of road junctions in the United Kingdom: E
List of road junctions in the United Kingdom: F
List of road junctions in the United Kingdom: G
List of road junctions in the United Kingdom: H
List of road junctions in the United Kingdom: I-K
List of road junctions in the United Kingdom: L
List of road junctions in the United Kingdom: M
List of road junctions in the United Kingdom: N
List of road junctions in the United Kingdom: O
List of road junctions in the United Kingdom: P
List of road junctions in the United Kingdom: Q
List of road junctions in the United Kingdom: R
List of road junctions in the United Kingdom: S
List of road junctions in the United Kingdom: T
List of road junctions in the United Kingdom: U-V
List of road junctions in the United Kingdom: W
List of road junctions in the United Kingdom: X-Z